Certificate may refer to:

 Birth certificate
 Marriage certificate
 Death certificate
 Gift certificate
 Certificate of authenticity, a document or seal certifying the authenticity of something
 Certificate of deposit, or CD, a financial product commonly offered to consumers by banks, thrift institutions and credit unions

Computing
 Authorization certificate or attribute certificate
 Certificate (complexity), a string that certifies the answer to a computation
 Public key certificate, an electronic document used in cryptography

Academic qualification
 Academic certificate
 Medical certificate
 Professional certification, a vocational award
 A confirmation that a person has passed a Test (assessment) to prove competence
 Global Assessment Certificate is a university preparation and foundation studies program
 Graduate certificate

Australia
 Higher School Certificate (New South Wales), a school qualification in New South Wales, Australia
 Victorian Certificate of Education, a school qualification in Victoria, Australia
 Certificates awarded by TAFE colleges, see

Ireland
 Junior Certificate, a qualification attained by school students
 Irish Leaving Certificate, a higher qualification attained by school students
 National Certificate, an older higher education qualification
 Higher Certificate, a newer higher education qualification
 Certificate (HETAC), a subdegree qualification offered by the Higher Education and Training Awards Council

Hong Kong
 Hong Kong Certificate of Education Examination

United Kingdom
 Certificate of Higher Education, awarded after one year full-time study at a university or other higher education institution

Other uses
 The Certificate, a 1967 novel by Isaac Bashevis Singer

See also
 Certificate of Achievement (disambiguation)
 Certification
 Academic degree
 Motion picture rating system
 
 

ka:ატესტატი
nl:Certificaat (verklaring)